A ski helmet is a helmet specifically designed and constructed for winter sports. Use was rare until about 2000, but by about 2010 the great majority of skiers and snowboarders in the US and Europe wear helmets. Helmets are available in many styles, and typically consist of a hard plastic/resin shell with inner padding. Modern ski helmets may include many additional features such as vents, earmuffs, headphones, goggle mounts, and camera mounts.

Risks

In terms of injuries per 1,000 skier or snowboarder days, Switzerland reports around 3.5, Norway 1.5, Vermont USA 1.9, and Canada 2.5. The death rate in the US is about one per million visits. of which more than half are related to head injuries.

Studies from Switzerland, Germany, Austria, Norway and Canada show that the proportion of head injuries is estimated at 15% for ski injuries and 16% for snowboard injuries. 74% of head injuries occur when skiers hit their head on the snow, 10% when they collided with other skiers, and 13% when they collided with fixed objects.

Usage
Germany, Austria, and Switzerland report 40%, 63%, 76% helmet wearing rates respectively. Switzerland reports a 95% helmet wearing rate among children. In France 65% of children wear helmets. In the 2012-2013 ski season, 70 percent of all skiers and snowboarders wore helmets, up 5% from the previous season. Helmets are compulsory for children in Italy and some states of Austria, in the US state of New Jersey and for employees at Vail Ski Resort in the US, and for all in the Canadian province of Nova Scotia and some other areas such as terrain parks.

Standards and testing
Product certification norms include the European CE standard CEN 1077, issued in 1996, The American Society of Testing and Materials F2040, and the Snell RS-98. CEN 1077 permits an impact speed of about approx 20 km/h, which is far below average skiing speeds. At such speeds, impact with a fixed object is likely to be fatal regardless of helmet use.

Effects

A meta-analysis, mostly of case-control studies, showed that skiers and snowboarders with a helmet were significantly less likely than those without a helmet to have a head injury. However, Swiss statistics on rescue services provided to people injured in snow sports show a fairly constant proportion of head injuries while the observed rate of helmet wearing increased from 16% in 2002-3 to 76% in 2009-10.

Helmets have been shown to reduce the incidence of head injuries. Helmets have not been shown to reduce the number of fatalities. According to Dr. Jasper . "We are up to 40 percent usage but there has been no change in fatalities in a 10-year period."

It is not known whether helmet use results in risk compensation, i.e. skiers and snowboarders behaving less cautiously when they feel protected by a helmet, as studies give conflicting results. One study found that helmeted skiers tend to go faster and helmet-wearing has been associated with self-reports of more risky behavior. Other studies find that helmet use is not associated with self-reports of riskier behavior and does not increase the risk of other injuries.

References

Further reading

Helmet
Snowboarding
Headgear
Helmets
Protective gear